Government of Mohammad-Ali Rajai was the first government of Iran after the Iranian Revolution. At that time, Abolhassan Banisadr was president and Mohammad-Ali Rajai was prime minister.

Bani Sadr's Presidency

He was elected to a four-year term as president on 25 January 1980, receiving 78.9 percent of the vote in a competitive election against Ahmad Madani, Hassan Habibi, Sadegh Tabatabaee, Dariush Forouhar, Sadegh Ghotbzadeh, Kazem Sami, Mohammad Makri, Hassan Ghafourifard, and Hassan Ayat, and inaugurated on 4 February. Khomeini remained the Supreme Leader of Iran, with the constitutional authority to dismiss the President. The inaugural ceremonies were held at the hospital where Khomeini was recovering from a heart ailment.

Banisadr was not an Islamic cleric; Khomeini had insisted that clerics should not run for positions in the government. In August and September 1980, Banisadr survived two helicopter crashes near the Iranian border with Iraq.

Banisadr soon fell out with Khomeini, who reclaimed the power of Commander-in-Chief on 10 June 1981.

Rajai's Prime Ministership
After the Iranian Revolution in 1979, he became Minister of Education in the Interim Government of Mehdi Bazargan. When Abolhassan Banisadr was elected as president, The parliament elected him as the new prime minister. He was prime minister of Islamic Republic of Iran from 1980 to 1981. He was also Minister of Foreign Affairs for five months, 11 March 1981 to 15 August 1981, while he was Prime Minister.

Members of the cabinet
During the nomination process, there were serious tensions between Rajai and Banisadr due to the latter's objections over the candidates.

List of members of Rajai's cabinet was as follows:

See also

Cabinet of Iran

References

1980 establishments in Iran
1981 disestablishments in Iran
Iran
Iran
Rajai